Lovelock may refer to:

Places
 Lovelock, California, United States
 Lovelock, Nevada, United States
 Lovelock Correctional Center, in Nevada

People
 Lovelock (surname), a surname (including a list of people with the name)

Science
Lovelock's theorem, a theorem about gravity
Lovelock theory of gravity, an extension of Einstein's theory of general relativity
51663 Lovelock, a minor planet

Arts and media
Lovelock (novel), a science fiction novel by Orson Scott Card and Kathryn H. Kidd
 Lovelock, a book by James McNeish about Jack Lovelock
 Lovelock! (album), 1976 soul/disco album by Gene Page

Other meanings
 Lovelock (hair), late 16th – early 17th century European "men of fashion" might wear a lovelock
 Lovelock Shield, an Australian rules football competition 
 Lovelock Cave, an archaeological site in North America

See also
Love lock, a symbol of romantic love
 Locks of Love, a US-based charity